is a Japanese politician of the Liberal Democratic Party, a member of the House of Councillors in the Diet (national legislature). A native of Chiryū, Aichi and graduate of Nihon University, he was elected to the House of Councillors for the first time in 1995 after serving in the city assembly of Chiryū for one term and then the Aichi Prefectural Assembly.

Honours
 Grand Cordon of the Order of the Rising Sun (2018)

References

External links 
  in Japanese.

Members of the House of Councillors (Japan)
Living people
1948 births
People from Chiryū
Liberal Democratic Party (Japan) politicians
Nihon University alumni
Grand Cordons of the Order of the Rising Sun
Members of the Aichi Prefectural Assembly
Japanese municipal councilors
Politicians from Aichi Prefecture